This is a list of Boston Bruins award winners.

League awards

Team trophies

Individual awards

All-Stars

NHL first and second team All-Stars
The NHL first and second team All-Stars are the top players at each position as voted on by the Professional Hockey Writers' Association.

NHL All-Rookie Team
The NHL All-Rookie Team consists of the top rookies at each position as voted on by the Professional Hockey Writers' Association.

All-Star Game selections
The National Hockey League All-Star Game is a mid-season exhibition game held annually between many of the top players of each season. Sixty-four All-Star Games have been held since 1947, with at least one player chosen to represent the Bruins in each year. The All-Star game has not been held in various years: 1979 and 1987 due to the 1979 Challenge Cup and Rendez-vous '87 series between the NHL and the Soviet national team, respectively, 1995, 2005, and 2013 as a result of labor stoppages, 2006, 2010, and 2014 because of the Winter Olympic Games, and 2021 as a result of the COVID-19 pandemic. Boston has hosted two of the games. The 24th took place at the Boston Garden and 46th took place at TD Garden, then known as the FleetCenter.

 Selected by fan vote
 All-Star Game Most Valuable Player

All-Star benefit games
Prior to the institution of the National Hockey League All-Star Game the league held three different benefit games featuring teams of all-stars.  The first was the Ace Bailey Benefit Game, held in 1934, after a violent collision with Boston's Eddie Shore left Ace Bailey of the Toronto Maple Leafs hospitalized and unable to continue his playing career. In 1937 the Howie Morenz Memorial Game was held to raise money for the family of Howie Morenz of the Montreal Canadiens who died from complications after being admitted to the hospital for a broken leg. The Babe Siebert Memorial Game was held in 1939 to raise funds for the family of the Canadiens' Babe Siebert who drowned shortly after he retired from playing.

All-Star Game replacement events

Career achievements

Hockey Hall of Fame
The following is a list of Boston Bruins who have been enshrined in the Hockey Hall of Fame.

Foster Hewitt Memorial Award
Two members of the Boston Bruins organization have been honored with the Foster Hewitt Memorial Award. The award is presented by the Hockey Hall of Fame to members of the radio and television industry who make outstanding contributions to their profession and the game of ice hockey during their broadcasting career.

Lester Patrick Trophy
The Lester Patrick Trophy has been presented by the National Hockey League and USA Hockey since 1966 to honor a recipient's contribution to ice hockey in the United States. This list includes all personnel who have ever been employed by the Boston Bruins in any capacity and have also received the Lester Patrick Trophy.

United States Hockey Hall of Fame

Retired numbers

The Boston Bruins have retired twelve of their jersey numbers, beginning with Lionel Hitchman's #3, the first jersey in NHL history (and the second in North American sports history) to be retired. Also out of circulation is the number 99 which was retired league-wide for Wayne Gretzky on February 6, 2000. Gretzky did not play for the Bruins during his 20-year NHL career and no Bruins player had ever worn the number 99 prior to its retirement.

Team awards

Eddie Shore Award
The Eddie Shore Award, named for Bruins great Eddie Shore, is an annual award established in 1942 given to the player "demonstrating exceptional hustle and determination" throughout the season as determined by the "Gallery Gods", an informal fan organization originally composed of season ticket holders in the old second balcony of Boston Garden

Elizabeth C. Dufresne Trophy
The Elizabeth C. Dufresne Trophy is an annual award given to the player who is "most outstanding in home games" as voted by the Boston chapter of the Professional Hockey Writers' Association. Along with other team awards, the Dufresne Trophy is traditionally presented at the last home game of each regular season. The most frequently honored player is Ray Bourque, who won the Dufresne Trophy seven times. Brad Marchand, Phil Esposito and Bobby Orr each won it five times, while Milt Schmidt and Rick Middleton won it four times each.

John P. Bucyk Award
The John P. Bucyk Award, named for Bruins great Johnny Bucyk, is an annual award given for "Charitable and Community Endeavors."

Seventh Player Award
The Seventh Player Award is an annual award given to the player who "performed beyond expectations" as voted by Bruins fans.  It was originally established by the team's television broadcasters, WSBK-TV, and awarded by them for many years.

Three Stars awards
The Bruins Three Stars Awards are annual awards given to the top three performers at home during the regular season.

Other awards

See also
List of National Hockey League awards

Notes

References

Boston Bruins
awards
History of the Boston Bruins